East Wake High School (formerly known as Vaiden Whitley High School) is a public high school located in Wendell, North Carolina, in the United States. It is part of the Wake County Public School System.  The school serves the Wake County towns of Wendell and Zebulon as well as the surrounding unincorporated parts of eastern Wake County.

Notable alumni 
 Greg Ellis, former NFL defensive end from 1998–2009 and Pro Bowl selection in 2007
 Gregory Helms, professional wrestler in the WWE and WCW
 Darren Jackson, Democratic member of the North Carolina House of Representatives
 Johnny Perry, professional strongman competitor

References 

Schools in Wake County, North Carolina
Public high schools in North Carolina